Trull is an English language surname. It may refer to:

Andrew Trull (1956–2004), British scientist
Don Trull (born 1941), American football player
Frankie Trull (born 1958), American lobbyist
John Trull (1738–1797), American military leader
Tammy Trull (born 1984), American actress
Teresa Trull (born 1950), American singer

See also
Trull, a village in England

English-language surnames